Start is the fourth studio album and first cover album by Singaporean singer Stefanie Sun, released on 1 February 2002 by Warner Music Taiwan.

Track listing
 "Hey Jude" – originally by the Beatles
 "Silent All These Years" – originally by Tori Amos
 "橄欖樹" (Olive Tree) – originally by Chyi Yu
 "沒時間" (Too Little Time) – originally by Karen Mok
 "Sometimes Love Just Ain't Enough" – originally by Patty Smyth & Don Henley
 "原來你甚麼都不要" (Nothing You Want) – originally by A–mei
 "That I Would Be Good" – originally by Alanis Morissette
 "Venus" – originally by Shocking Blue
 "Someone"
 "天空" (Sky) – originally by Faye Wong
 "就是這樣" (That's the Way It Is)
 "Up 2U"

References

2002 albums
Stefanie Sun albums
Warner Music Taiwan albums